The 1987 Humboldt State Lumberjacks football team represented Humboldt State University during the 1987 NCAA Division II football season. Humboldt State competed in the Northern California Athletic Conference in 1987.

The 1987 Lumberjacks were led by second-year head coach Mike Dolby. They played home games at the Redwood Bowl in Arcata, California. On the field, Humboldt State finished with a record of three wins, seven losses and one tie (3–7–1, 2–2–1 NCAC). The Lumberjacks were outscored by their opponents 226–256 for the season.

It was later determined that UC Davis used an ineligible player in its November 21 victory over Humboldt State. They were required to forfeit the game, so Humboldt's adjusted record becomes four wins, six losses and one tie (4–6–1, 3–1–1 NCAC).

Schedule

Notes

References

Humboldt State
Humboldt State Lumberjacks football seasons
Humboldt State Lumberjacks football